Prophalangopsis is a South Asian insect genus, in the family Prophalangopsidae, related to katydids.

There is one species, found in North India and the Tibetan Plateau:
Prophalangopsis obscura

References

External links

Ensifera
Ensifera genera
Monotypic Orthoptera genera